Hailey Van Lith (born September 9, 2001) is an American college basketball player for the Louisville Cardinals of the Atlantic Coast Conference (ACC).

Early life and high school career
Van Lith grew up training for basketball under the guidance of her father, Corey. She played for Cashmere High School in Cashmere, Washington. As a freshman, Van Lith averaged 24.3 points, 6.5 rebounds, 4.3 assists and 3.8 steals per game, leading her team to the Class 1A state title game. On January 25, 2018, as a sophomore, she recorded the first quadruple-double in program history, with 37 points, 14 steals, 10 rebounds and 10 assists against Chelan High School. She averaged 32 points, 8.3 rebounds, 7.3 steals and 5.2 assists per game, was named Class 1A Player of the Year and led Cashmere to a state runner-up finish. 

As a junior, Van Lith averaged 34.4 points, 8.3 rebounds, 5.2 steals and 4.9 assists per game, and was named Washington Gatorade Player of the Year. On February 15, 2020, in her senior season, she became the state all-time leading scorer as part of a 46-point performance against Omak High School. Van Lith finished the season with averages of 32.6 points, 9.4 rebounds, 4.8 assists and 4.2 steals per game as a senior, helping her team reach the Class 1A state final for a third time. She repeated as Washington Gatorade Player of the Year and was named to the McDonald's All-American Game roster.

Recruiting
Van Lith was considered a five-star recruit and one of the top players in the 2020 class by ESPN. On November 16, 2019, she committed to playing college basketball for Louisville, choosing the Cardinals over an offer from Baylor. Van Lith played softball in high school and had held offers from NCAA Division I softball programs by eighth grade.

College career
On November 29, 2020, in her second career game at Louisville, Van Lith recorded 20 points and 11 rebounds in a 101–58 win against Eastern Kentucky. On March 5, 2021, at the ACC tournament quarterfinals, she posted a freshman season-high 24 points, five rebounds and four steals in a 65–53 victory over Wake Forest. As a freshman, Van Lith averaged 11.2 points, 5.2 rebounds and 2.1 assists per game, and was an ACC All-Freshman Team selection.

National team career
Van Lith represented the United States at the 2018 FIBA Under-17 World Cup in Belarus, and won a gold medal. At the 2019 FIBA Under-19 World Cup in Thailand, she averaged 9.1 points, 2.3 rebounds and 2.3 assists per game, helping the United States win the gold medal.

In 3x3 basketball, Van Lith won a gold medal with the United States at the 2018 Summer Youth Olympics in Argentina. She led her team to another gold medal at the 2019 FIBA 3x3 Under-18 World Cup in Mongolia, where she was named most valuable player.

Personal life
Van Lith's father, Corey, played baseball and basketball at University of Puget Sound. In high school, she was mentored by Kobe Bryant. She trained at Bryant's Mamba Sports Academy in Thousand Oaks, California and developed a friendship with his daughter, Gianna.

References

External links
 Louisville Cardinals bio
 USA Basketball bio

2001 births
Living people
American women's basketball players
Basketball players from Washington (state)
People from Wenatchee, Washington
Point guards
Louisville Cardinals women's basketball players
McDonald's High School All-Americans
Basketball players at the 2018 Summer Youth Olympics
Youth Olympic gold medalists for the United States